Les Monégasques may refer to: 

 Les Monégasques, a band formed by Jean-Pierre Massiera and Pierre Malaussena in 1964 
 Les Monégasques, a nickname for the French football club AS Monaco FC

See also 

 Monaco (disambiguation)
 Monégasque (disambiguation)

Disambiguation pages